Fernand Bouisson (16 June 1874 – 28 December 1959) was a Socialist French politician of the Third Republic, who served as President of the Chamber of Deputies from 1927 to 1936 and briefly as Prime Minister in June 1935 following the ouster of Pierre-Étienne Flandin.

Bouisson's Ministry, 1–7 June 1935
Fernand Bouisson – President of the Council and Minister of the Interior
Georges Pernot – Vice President of the Council and Minister of Justice
Pierre Laval – Minister of Foreign Affairs
Louis Maurin – Minister of War
Joseph Caillaux – Minister of Finance
Ludovic-Oscar Frossard – Minister of Labour
François Piétri – Minister of Marine and interim Minister of Merchant Marine
Victor Denain – Minister of Air
Mario Roustan – Minister of National Education
Camille Perfetti – Minister of Pensions
Paul Jacquier – Minister of Agriculture
Louis Rollin – Minister of Colonies
Joseph Paganon – Minister of Public Works
Louis Lafont – Minister of Public Health and Physical Education
Georges Mandel – Minister of Posts, Telegraphs, and Telephones
Laurent Eynac – Minister of Commerce and Industry
Édouard Herriot – Minister of State
Louis Marin – Minister of State
Philippe Pétain – Minister of State

References 

1874 births
1959 deaths
People from Constantine, Algeria
People of French Algeria
Pieds-Noirs
French Section of the Workers' International politicians
Republican-Socialist Party politicians
Prime Ministers of France
French interior ministers
Presidents of the Chamber of Deputies (France)
Members of the 9th Chamber of Deputies of the French Third Republic
Members of the 10th Chamber of Deputies of the French Third Republic
Members of the 11th Chamber of Deputies of the French Third Republic
Members of the 12th Chamber of Deputies of the French Third Republic
Members of the 13th Chamber of Deputies of the French Third Republic
Members of the 14th Chamber of Deputies of the French Third Republic
Members of the 15th Chamber of Deputies of the French Third Republic
Members of the 16th Chamber of Deputies of the French Third Republic
Socialist Party (France) politicians